Edward Kemys (c. 1693–1736), of Bertholey House, Monmouthshire, was a Tory politician who sat in the House of Commons from 1722 to 1734.

Kemys was the eldest son of Edward Kemys of Pertholey and Maesgenwith and his wife Anne Bray, daughter of Reginald Bray of Barrington, Gloucestershire. He was educated at Eton College from  1705 to 1711, succeeding his father in 1710.  He was admitted at King's College, Cambridge in 1712 and became a fellow of Kings in 1715. He was awarded BA in 1716 and  MA in 1719.  
 
At the 1722 British general election, Kemys was returned unopposed as a Tory Member of Parliament for Monmouth Boroughs  by the Duke of Beaufort. He was returned again unopposed at the  1727 British general election. His only recorded vote was against the Administration on the Hessians in 1730. He did not stand again in 1734.

Kemys died unmarried in 1736.

References

1693 births
1736 deaths
People educated at Eton College
Alumni of King's College, Cambridge
People from Monmouthshire
Members of the Parliament of Great Britain for Welsh constituencies
British MPs 1722–1727
British MPs 1727–1734